Marie Armande Jeanne Gacon-Dufour (1753-1835) was a French economist and writer.

References

1753 births
1835 deaths
French women economists
18th-century French economists
19th-century French economists